The 5th constituency of Charente-Maritime (French: Cinquième circonscription de la Charente-Maritime) is one of five electoral districts in the department of Charente-Maritime, each of which returns one deputy to the French National Assembly in elections using the two-round system, with a run-off if no candidate receives more than 50% of the vote in the first round.

Description
The constituency is made up of nine (pre-2015) cantons: those of Le Château-d'Oléron, Marennes, Royan-Ouest, Saint-Agnant, Saint-Pierre-d'Oléron, Saint-Porchaire, Saujon, Tonnay-Charente, and La Tremblade.

At the time of the 1999 census (which was the basis for the most recent redrawing of constituency boundaries, carried out in 2010) the 5th constituency had a total population of 112,002.

Deputies

Election results

2022

 
 
 
 
 
 
 
 
|-
| colspan="8" bgcolor="#E9E9E9"|
|-

2017

2012

|- style="background-color:#E9E9E9;text-align:center;"
! colspan="2" rowspan="2" style="text-align:left;" | Candidate
! rowspan="2" colspan="2" style="text-align:left;" | Party
! colspan="2" | 1st round
! colspan="2" | 2nd round
|- style="background-color:#E9E9E9;text-align:center;"
! width="75" | Votes
! width="30" | %
! width="75" | Votes
! width="30" | %
|-
| style="background-color:" |
| style="text-align:left;" | Didier Quentin
| style="text-align:left;" | Union for a Popular Movement
| UMP
| 
| 41.68%
| 
| 53.99%
|-
| style="background-color:" |
| style="text-align:left;" | Pascal Ferchaud
| style="text-align:left;" | Radical Party of the Left
| PRG
| 
| 34.79%
| 
| 46.01%
|-
| style="background-color:" |
| style="text-align:left;" | Jean-Marc de Lacoste Lareymondie
| style="text-align:left;" | Front National
| FN
| 
| 14.10%
| colspan="2" style="text-align:left;" |
|-
| style="background-color:" |
| style="text-align:left;" | Jacques Guiard
| style="text-align:left;" | Left Front
| FG
| 
| 3.76%
| colspan="2" style="text-align:left;" |
|-
| style="background-color:" |
| style="text-align:left;" | Laurence Marcillaud
| style="text-align:left;" | Europe Ecology – The Greens
| EELV
| 
| 2.05%
| colspan="2" style="text-align:left;" |
|-
| style="background-color:" |
| style="text-align:left;" | Michel Renault
| style="text-align:left;" | Centrist
| CEN
| 
| 1.54%
| colspan="2" style="text-align:left;" |
|-
| style="background-color:" |
| style="text-align:left;" | Sylvie Moreau
| style="text-align:left;" | Ecologist
| ECO
| 
| 0.98%
| colspan="2" style="text-align:left;" |
|-
| style="background-color:" |
| style="text-align:left;" | Pascale Lequeux
| style="text-align:left;" | Ecologist
| ECO
| 
| 0.58%
| colspan="2" style="text-align:left;" |
|-
| style="background-color:" |
| style="text-align:left;" | Anne Bernon
| style="text-align:left;" | Far Left
| EXG
| 
| 0.53%
| colspan="2" style="text-align:left;" |
|-
| colspan="8" style="background-color:#E9E9E9;"|
|- style="font-weight:bold"
| colspan="4" style="text-align:left;" | Total
| 
| 100%
| 
| 100%
|-
| colspan="8" style="background-color:#E9E9E9;"|
|-
| colspan="4" style="text-align:left;" | Registered voters
| 
| style="background-color:#E9E9E9;"|
| 
| style="background-color:#E9E9E9;"|
|-
| colspan="4" style="text-align:left;" | Blank/Void ballots
| 
| 0.77%
| 
| 1.51%
|-
| colspan="4" style="text-align:left;" | Turnout
| 
| 59.44%
| 
| 58.65%
|-
| colspan="4" style="text-align:left;" | Abstentions
| 
| 40.56%
| 
| 41.35%
|-
| colspan="8" style="background-color:#E9E9E9;"|
|- style="font-weight:bold"
| colspan="6" style="text-align:left;" | Result
| colspan="2" style="background-color:" | UMP HOLD
|}

2007

2002

 
 
 
 
 
 
 
|-
| colspan="8" bgcolor="#E9E9E9"|
|-

1997

References

Sources
 Notes and portraits of the French MPs under the Fifth Republic, French National Assembly
 2012 French legislative elections: Charente-Maritime's 5th constituency (first round and run-off), Minister of the Interior

5